Deh Yusefan-e Sofla (also Romanized as Deh Yūsefān-e Soflá; also known as Deh Yūsefān-e Pā'īn and Dīv Saffān-e Soflá) is a village in Mirbag-e Jonubi Rural District, in the Central District of Delfan County, Lorestan Province, Iran. At the 2006 census, its population was 194, in 42 families.

References 

Towns and villages in Delfan County